RasGEF domain family, member 1A is a protein that in humans is encoded by the RASGEF1A gene.

References

Further reading